Lamin Basmen Samateh (born 26 June 1992) is a Gambian football defender who currently plays for Saudi First Division side Jeddah.

Lamin Samateh plays usually as central defender, although he can also play as right-back. While playing in his home country, he was known by the nickname of Gunman.

He came to Zagreb in January 2011 during the 2010–11 Prva HNL winter break, signed from Gambian Championnat National D1 club Steve Biko FC, which ended up relegated. For the rest of the season, he made 7 league appearances scoring one goal, with Lokomotiva in the 2010–11 season.

During 2009 he was part of the Gambian U-17 squad which played in the 2009 FIFA U-17 World Cup. During 2010 he was part of Gambian U-20 team. In early 2011 he was part of the Gambian squad at the 2011 African Youth Championship.

On September 3, 2011, he made his debut for the Gambian national team in a match against Namibia for the 2012 Africa Cup of Nations qualification.

On 13 August 2022, Samateh joined Saudi Arabian club Jeddah.

References

External sources
 
 

1992 births
Living people
Gambian footballers
The Gambia international footballers
The Gambia youth international footballers
Gambian expatriate footballers
Association football defenders
NK Lokomotiva Zagreb players
Kuopion Palloseura players
FC ViOn Zlaté Moravce players
CO Médenine players
Muaither SC players
Al-Nojoom FC players
Jeddah Club players
Naft Maysan FC players
Croatian Football League players
Slovak Super Liga players
Veikkausliiga players
Tunisian Ligue Professionnelle 1 players
Qatari Second Division players
Saudi First Division League players
Iraqi Premier League players
Expatriate footballers in Croatia
Gambian expatriate sportspeople in Croatia
Expatriate footballers in Finland
Gambian expatriate sportspeople in Finland
Expatriate footballers in Slovakia
Gambian expatriate sportspeople in Slovakia
Expatriate footballers in Tunisia
Gambian expatriate sportspeople in Tunisia
Expatriate footballers in Qatar
Gambian expatriate sportspeople in Qatar
Expatriate footballers in Saudi Arabia
Gambian expatriate sportspeople in Saudi Arabia
Expatriate footballers in Iraq